Between Two Hearts (German: Zwischen zwei Herzen) is a 1934 German drama film directed by Herbert Selpin and starring Harry Liedtke, Luise Ullrich and Olga Tschechowa. It is based on the novel Ulla die Tochter by Werner Scheff. It was shot at the Marienfelde Studios of Terra Film in Berlin and on location in Bavaria. The film's sets were designed by the art director Robert A. Dietrich.

Cast
 Harry Liedtke as Detlev Sonnekamp
 Luise Ullrich as Ulla Georgius
 Olga Tschechowa as 	Inge Leuthoff
 Fritz Odemar as 	Rudolf Kämmerer
 Paul Henckels as 	Dr. Georgius
 Erna Morena as 	Frau Georgius
 Franz Nicklisch as Harald Söldin
 Paul Otto as Justizrat Röseler
 Paul Heidemann as Golm, Diener bei Sonnekamp
 Anna Müller-Lincke as Dora Jänisch
 Josef Dahmen as Müller, Chauffeur bei Sonnekamp
 Ernst Dernburg		
 Erich Bartels		
 Franz Klebusch

References

Bibliography
 Goble, Alan. The Complete Index to Literary Sources in Film. Walter de Gruyter, 1999.
 Waldman, Harry. Nazi Films in America, 1933-1942. McFarland, 2008.

External links 
 

1934 films
Films of Nazi Germany
German drama films
1934 drama films
1930s German-language films
German black-and-white films
1930s German films
Films directed by Herbert Selpin
Terra Film films
Films shot at Terra Studios
Films shot in Bavaria

de:Zwischen zwei Herzen